Dandot railway station is located in Dandot RS village, Pind Dadan Khan Tehsil, in the Jhelum District of Punjab province, Pakistan.

See also
 List of railway stations in Pakistan
 Pakistan Railways

References

External links

Railway stations in Jhelum District
Railway stations on Dandot Light Railway Line